Richard Samuel Guinness (7 June 1797 – 27 August 1857) was an Irish lawyer and a Member of Parliament.

Parents
Guinness was one of the sons of Richard Guinness (1755-1829), a Dublin barrister and judge, and his wife Mary Darley, descended from a well-known Dublin house-building family. He was a great-nephew of the brewer Arthur Guinness.

His elder brother Robert Rundell Guinness (1789-1857) founded the Guinness Mahon merchant bank in 1836.

Career
Guinness was called to the bar at the King's Inns in Dublin and practised as a barrister. He was also a banker in partnership with his elder brother Robert, but this was dissolved in the 1830s. He then worked as a land agent, trading as "R. Guinness & Co.", but found it difficult in the aftermath of the Irish famine of the 1840s.

At the general election of August 1847, standing as a Conservative, Guinness was elected as a member of the Parliament of the United Kingdom of Great Britain and Ireland for the Kinsale division, and took his seat at Westminster. However, an election petition was filed by the losing Whig candidate, W. H. Watson, and early in 1848 a select committee found that Guinness's agents' generous hospitality in providing free drinks for the electorate of Kinsale in Kiley's public house had amounted to bribery. The committee comprised three Whigs and two fellow Conservatives. While Guinness was personally exonerated, his election was declared void. He did not stand at the resulting by-election, and the Whig Benjamin Hawes took the seat by just three votes.

At a double by-election on 25 August 1854, Guinness was again elected to parliament as a Conservative, this time for Barnstaple in Devon, and held the seat for three years, but did not stand for re-election at the general election of 1857.

Personal life
On 25 November 1833, at the residence of the British ambassador to France, in Verdun, Guinness married Katherine Frances Jenkinson, a daughter of Sir Charles Jenkinson, 10th Baronet and his wife Katherine Campbell, a daughter of Walter Campbell of Shawfield. Sir Charles was a cousin of Lord Liverpool, the Prime Minister in 1812–27.

They rebuilt and lived at Deepwell House, Blackrock, Dublin, and also had other houses at 17 Sillwood Place, Brighton, Sussex, and 4 Park Place, St James's, Westminster.

They couple had eight children, including:
 Col. Charles W. N. Guinness CB (1839–1894)
 Arthur C. C. J. Guinness (1841–1897), who emigrated to Melbourne
 Sir Reginald R. B. Guinness (1842-1909) JP, DL for County Dublin
 Adelaide (1844-1916), known as “Dodo”, who married her third cousin Edward Guinness, 1st Earl of Iveagh
 Claude H. C. Guinness (1852–1895), the managing director of Guinness 1886-95

Guinness became known within his family as Old Pelican or Old Pel.

Guinness died in Dublin in 1857, aged 60. His executors were Samuel Nalty and Anna Maria Yelverton. His net estate at death was just £100.

Notes

Irish barristers
19th-century Irish lawyers
Members of the Parliament of the United Kingdom for County Cork constituencies (1801–1922)
Irish Conservative Party MPs
1797 births
1857 deaths
Richard Samuel
Alumni of King's Inns
Conservative Party (UK) MPs for English constituencies
Members of the Parliament of the United Kingdom for Barnstaple
UK MPs 1847–1852
UK MPs 1852–1857
19th-century Irish businesspeople